Max Ventures and Industries Limited is an Indian public company of Max Group, headquartered in New Delhi, India. It is the holding company for the group's real estate business, Max Estates; packaging business, Max Speciality Films; and the educational arm, Max Learning. The company sold a 49% stake of the speciality film business to Toppan Printing, a global printing company headquartered in Tokyo, Japan.

Subsidiaries

Max Estates
Max Estates is a wholly owned subsidiary of Max Ventures and Industries, which is involved in the construction and leasing of commercial and residential projects. As of May 2020, it has completed three projects: Max Towers, an office complex in Noida, 222 Rajpur, a residential colony in Dehradun, and Max House, a commercial space in New Delhi.

Max Speciality Films
Max Speciality Films is a joint venture with the Japan-based Toppan Printing. The company is involved in packaging films business, supplying its BoPP films to FMCG companies in India for use in food, clinical products.

References

External links
 
 Max Ventures and Industries on Wall Street Journal
 Max Financial Services Limited on The Economic Times

Holding companies of India
Indian brands
Companies based in New Delhi
Max Group
2015 establishments in Delhi
Indian companies established in 2015
Holding companies established in 2015
Companies listed on the National Stock Exchange of India
Companies listed on the Bombay Stock Exchange